Saving Africa's Witch Children is a documentary directed by Mags Gavan and Joost van der Valk. It features Gary Foxcroft and his organisation Stepping Stones Nigeria who campaign against the branding of children as witches in Nigeria, primarily by the evangelical "Liberty Foundation Gospel Ministries", headed by Helen Ukpabio.

In some of the poorest parts of Nigeria, Pentecostal evangelical religious fervour is combined with the old but persistent African belief in sorcery and black magic. Thousands of children are victimised, abused, abandoned or even killed as they are blamed for having brought about disease, misfortune, death and famine by their alleged witchcraft.

The film was part of Channel 4's Dispatches Series and won numerous awards, including a BAFTA and an International Emmy for Best Current Affairs.

See also
Witchcraft accusations against children in Africa
Witchcraft accusations against children

References

External links
 

African witchcraft
Channel 4 documentaries
Childhood in Nigeria
Christianity in Nigeria
Dispatches (TV programme)
Documentary films about child abuse
Documentary films about Nigeria
Human rights in Nigeria
Infanticide
Modern witch hunts
Works about religion and children